Ghitorni is a village in the South West district in the state of Delhi, India. It is located in southern Delhi, near the Gurgaon border and Vasant Kunj. In the 2011 census the population was 14,893. The population consists mainly of Lohmod Clan of Gurjar Community (80%), as well as the Brahmans (10%), Scheduled Castes (5%), Aggarwals and others (5%) (estimated).It comes between Aya Nagar and Sultanpur

Infrastructure
Ghitorni lies on the Mehrauli Gurgaon Road, Ghitorni village is well connected by metro station it is the third metro station from Qutub minar metro station towards Gurugram on the yellow line and the metro station is named "Ghitorni"; the metro station has got two main entry/exit gates either side of MG road both the gates are equipped with two lifts. 
Ghitorni is served by DTC bus routes 517,525, and BG which run along the Mehrauli Gurgaon Road.

References

External links
Ghitorni station on Mehrauli http://chasingthemetro.files.wordpress.com/2012/10/12-01-ghitorni.jpg

Cities and towns in South West Delhi district
Neighbourhoods in Delhi